James Minter (13 September 1917 – 2 July 1985) was an Australian cricketer. He played one first-class match for New South Wales in 1938/39.

See also
 List of New South Wales representative cricketers

References

External links
 

1917 births
1985 deaths
Australian cricketers
New South Wales cricketers
People from the Mid North Coast
Cricketers from New South Wales